Group 5 consisted of three of the 32 teams entered into the European zone: England, Poland, and Wales. These three teams competed on a home-and-away basis for one of the 9.5 spots in the final tournament allocated to the European zone, with the group's winner claiming the place in the finals.

This was the first time England failed to qualify for the World Cup since first entering in 1950.

Standings

Matches

Notes

External links 
Group 5 Detailed Results at RSSSF

5
1972–73 in English football
1973–74 in English football
1972–73 in Polish football
1973–74 in Polish football
1972–73 in Welsh football
1973–74 in Welsh football